This is a list of presidents of Ethiopia and also a list of heads of state after the fall of the Ethiopian Empire in 1974.

Until 1974, the heads of state of the Ethiopian Empire were either emperors or regents. From the coup d'état of the Derg leading to the fall of the empire in September 1974 until March 1975, the Derg considered the crown prince Asfaw Wossen (later regnal name Amha Selassie) as the king (n – which the crown prince refused to accept. During this time, the chairmen of the Derg, the leaders of the Derg, were to be considered as acting heads of state. On 21 March 1975, the Derg military junta abolished the monarchy and fully took over. Until the establishment of the People's Democratic Republic of Ethiopia in 1987, still dominated by Derg figures, chairmen of the Derg have to be considered heads of state – but not presidents. After the fall of the Derg and the establishment of the Transitional Government of Ethiopia in 1991, the first immediate president (Meles Zenawi) has to be considered an Interim President.

Since the formal establishment of the office of president in 1987, there have been 6 official presidents. The president is the head of state of Ethiopia. The current president is Sahle-Work Zewde, who is also the first female president of Ethiopia, elected on 25 October 2018 by members of the Federal Parliamentary Assembly.

List
In the list, the chairmen of the Derg are considered to be heads of state – but are not considered to be president. Consequently, the numbering starts with the first establishment of the office of the president of Ethiopia in 1987.

Timeline

See also
Emperor of Ethiopia
List of emperors of Ethiopia
President of Ethiopia
Prime Minister of Ethiopia
List of heads of government of Ethiopia
Rulers of Ethiopia
Vice President of Ethiopia

Notes

References

External links
World Statesmen – Ethiopia

Presidents of Ethiopia
Ethiopia

Government of Ethiopia

et:Etioopia riigipeade loend#Presidendid